List of A roads in zone 3 in Great Britain starting west of the A3 and south of the A4 (roads beginning with 3).

Single- and double-digit roads

Triple-digit roads

Four-digit roads (30xx)

Four-digit roads (31xx and higher)

Notes and references

Notes

References

 3
3